Rəhimli (also, Ragimli) is a village and municipality in the Agsu Rayon of Azerbaijan.  It has a population of 741.

Notable natives 

 Shamil Ramazanov — National Hero of Azerbaijan.

References 

Populated places in Agsu District